Commercium songs are traditional academic songs that are sung during academic feasts: commercia and tablerounds.

Some very old commercium songs are in Latin, like Meum est propositum or Gaudeamus igitur. 

In some countries, hundreds of commercium songs are compiled in commercium books.

 Allgemeines Deutsches Kommersbuch (Germany)
 Le petit bitu (Belgium)
 Studentencodex (Belgium)
 Carpe Diem (Belgium)
 Codex Studiosorum Bruxellensis (Belgium)

See also
 De Brevitate Vitae
 Academic Festival Overture
 Im schwarzen Walfisch zu Askalon
 Biernagel

External links

 English and Latin commercium songs
 Medieval Latin Students' Songs Translated into English Verse by John Addington Symonds

German styles of music
Song forms
19th century in music
20th century in music